Mander may refer to:

Mander (surname), a list of people so named
Mander, Overijssel, a village in Overijssel, Netherlands
Mander baronets, a title in the Baronetage of the United Kingdom
Mander Brothers, a company based in Wolverhampton, England (1773–1998)
Mander language, a nearly extinct Papuan language of Indonesia
Mander Organs, an English pipe organ maker and refurbisher based in London
Martin Ander, Swedish graphic designer, illustrator and artist known as Mander
Mander Auctioneers, Fine Art Auctioneers and Valuers, based in Sudbury, Suffolk